is a Japanese ski jumper. She has competed at World Cup level since the 2011/12 season, with her best individual result being sixth place in Lahti on 19 February 2016.

Representing the Japanese national team, she won a gold medal in the women's team competition at the 2012 Junior World Championships in Erzurum. She also won the first ever women's World Cup team competition in Hinterzarten on 16 December 2017, with her team-mates Yuki Ito, Yūka Setō, and Sara Takanashi.

References

1993 births
Living people
Sportspeople from Nagano Prefecture
Japanese female ski jumpers
Ski jumpers at the 2018 Winter Olympics
Ski jumpers at the 2022 Winter Olympics
Olympic ski jumpers of Japan
20th-century Japanese women
21st-century Japanese women